The 2nd Genie Awards were held March 12, 1981, honouring Canadian films released the previous year. The ceremony was held at the Royal Alexandra Theatre and was hosted by Brian Linehan. The most notable sight of the evening was Prime Minister Pierre Trudeau escorting starlet Kim Cattrall; the moment received renewed media attention in March 2016, when the American newsmagazine 60 Minutes, in a profile of Justin Trudeau, ran a photo of the appearance while misidentifying Cattrall as Margaret Trudeau.

The films Good Riddance (Les bons débarras) and Tribute tied for the most nominations overall. Good Riddance won most of the major awards, including Best Picture.

Later in the year the Academy of Canadian Cinema held the Bijou Awards, a separate ceremony designed to present many of the specialized categories that had been dropped from the Genies in their transition from the old Canadian Film Awards. That ceremony was held only once before being discontinued, and some later sources have erroneously credited some of its winners as Genie winners.

Nominees and winners

References

External links
Genie Awards 1981 on IMDb

02
Genie
Genie